João Evangelista Belfort Duarte, commonly known as Belfort Duarte (November 27, 1883 – November 27, 1918), was a Brazilian football central defender. The Belfort Duarte Award is named after him.

Playing career 

Born in São Luís, Maranhão state, he started his career in 1902, with Mackenzie College, where he translated the football rules to Portuguese. He was also one of the club's founders. Belfort Duarte worked for Light & Power company in 1906. He joined America-RJ in 1906, changing the club's colors from black to red in 1908. With America, he won the Campeonato Carioca in 1913. Belfort Duarte played his last game in 1915, against Flamengo.

Coaching career 

After his retirement, he started a coaching career, managing America in 1916, winning the state championship in that year.

Death 

Belfort Duarte was murdered on his birthday, November 27, 1918, in a favela located in Campo Belo, Minas Gerais state, when he was trying to hide from the Spanish flu.

Legacy 

The Belfort Duarte Award was instituted in 1946, by the Brazilian National Sports Council, after Belfort Duarte. The award is given to the football player who completes ten years without being booked with a red card. This award was named after Belfort Duarte because in a game he mentioned to the referee that he committed a foul in his club's penalty area.

References 

1883 births
1918 deaths
Brazilian footballers
Brazilian football managers
America Football Club (RJ) players
People from São Luís, Maranhão
Male murder victims
Association football central defenders
Brazilian murder victims
Sportspeople from Maranhão